Netinera (formerly Arriva Deutschland) is a railway company operating in Germany.

It was founded as a subsidiary of British Arriva plc in 2003 and initially headquartered in Hamburg. After the acquisition of Regentalbahn in 2004, the company's seat was located to Regentalbahn's head office at Viechtach in Bavaria. In the following years, many administrative and management positions were seated in Berlin, where the company headquarters were officially moved to in early 2023.

With Deutsche Bahn's purchase of Arriva in 2010, the European Commission ruled that Deutsche Bahn would have to shed Arriva's German operations in order to comply with competition rules. Keolis, Veolia and Ferrovie dello Stato Italiane expressed interest in buying the business.

It was sold to a Ferrovie dello Stato Italiane (51%) and French-Luxembourg investment fund Cube (49%) consortium. It was renamed Netinera in March 2011. In December 2020, Ferrovie dello Stato Italiane purchased Cube's shareholding.

Bus
In 2005 Arriva bought Sippel which operates buses in Frankfurt, Mainz, Wiesbaden and Erlangen. After losing several public contracts, Sippel closed at the end of 2021.

It went to buy Verkehrsbetriebe Bils in 2006, which operates buses in Münster, Warendorf and Hamm and later in the year it acquired Neißeverkehr which operates buses in the Neiße region.

With the purchase of a majority stake in Osthannoversche Eisenbahnen (OHE) in April 2007, OHE's bus subsidiaries Cebus in Celle and KVG Bus in Stade also became part of Arriva.

Rail
In 2004 Arriva acquired Prignitzer Eisenbahn (PEG), which operated several lines in Germany around Berlin, Brandenburg, Mecklenburg, North Rhine-Westphalia and Pomerania. Since 2012, PEG is mainly a holding company. Among it's assets is a 50 % stake in Ostdeutsche Eisenbahn (ODEG), which operates regional passenger services on various lines in the Northeast of Germany. 

In October 2004 it purchased a 77% shareholding in Regentalbahn with its subsidiary Vogtlandbahn, which operates regional rail services in southern and eastern Saxony, northern and southern Bavaria, eastern Thuringia as well as parts of the Czech Republic. In 2006 its shareholding was increased to 97%.

In April 2007, a company held by Arriva (95,34 %) and Verkehrsbetriebe Bachstein (4,66 %) acquired an 86% stake in the Osthannoversche Eisenbahnen (OHE) with the remaining 14% held by local municipalities. OHE is a majority shareholder in the Metronom Eisenbahngesellschaft which operates regional train services on the Hamburg to Bremen, Hamburg to Hanover, Hanover to Göttingen and Hanover to Wolfsburg lines. Erixx is fully owned by OHE and likewise operating regional passenger train services, albeit on more local lines. 

In September 2012, Netinera ordered 63 Alstom Coradia Lints which would be used on regional passenger train services in Rheinland-Pfalz under the umbrella of a new subsidiary called Vlexx. Operations started in December 2014 and were extended in December 2020.

References

External links
Netinera's official website

Ferrovie dello Stato Italiane
Railway companies of Germany
Railway companies established in 2003
2003 establishments in Germany